Eukaryotic initiation factor 4A-II is a protein that in humans is encoded by the EIF4A2 gene.

References

Further reading

External links